Jon Simonssøn (9 November 1512 – 29 July 1575) or Jon Simonsson, was a Norwegian city manager, lawspeaker and a humanist.

References

1512 births
1575 deaths
Norwegian humanists